USS Thad Cochran (DDG-135) is a planned  guided missile destroyer of the United States Navy, the 85th overall for the class. She will be named in honor of Republican U.S. Senator represented Mississippi, William Thad Cochran, who was a U.S. Navy ensign during 1959–1961, he also served as numerous subcommittees during his time in United States Senate.

References

 

Arleigh Burke-class destroyers
Proposed ships of the United States Navy